Arhyssus lateralis is a species of scentless plant bug in the family Rhopalidae. It is found in Central America and North America.

References

Articles created by Qbugbot
Insects described in 1825
Rhopalinae